The 76th District of the Iowa House of Representatives in the state of Iowa.

Current elected officials
David Maxwell is the representative currently representing the district.

Past representatives
The district has previously been represented by:
 William E. Gluba, 1971–1973
 Richard F. Drake, 1973–1977
 Walter Conlon, 1977–1983
 Perry K. Hummel, 1983–1989
 William J. Brand, 1989–1993
 Steven W. Churchill, 1993–1999
 Scott Raecker, 1999–2003
 Betty De Boef, 2003–2013
 David Maxwell, 2013–present

References

076